Losinoostrovsky District  is an administrative district (raion) of North-Eastern Administrative Okrug, and one of the 125 raions of Moscow, Russia. It is 14 km north of the Moscow city center, located just inside the Moscow Ring Road, with Moscow Oblast to the north, Severnoye Medvedkovo District to the west, Babushkinsky district to the south, and Yarosloavsky District to the east. Population: 72,100 (2017 est.). Although its name coincides with Losiny Ostrov National Park, the district does not even border the park. Its name in fact refers to Losinoostrovskaya railway station, in turn named after the park.

See also
Administrative divisions of Moscow

References

Notes

Sources

Districts of Moscow
North-Eastern Administrative Okrug